Northington v. State, 413 So.2d 1169 (1981), was a case decided by the Court of Criminal Appeals of Alabama that reversed a conviction for murder on the basis that depraved heart murder requires a universal malice directed towards human life in general rather than malice directed towards a specific individual.

Decision
Defendant Northington was convicted of murder after allowing her five-month-old daughter to starve to death.  The appellate court reversed the conviction because the mens rea requirement for depraved heart murder was held to be universal malice towards human life in general, and Northington displayed extreme reckless indifference towards her daughter only.

References

1981 in Alabama
1981 in United States case law
Alabama state case law
Child abuse case law
Filicides in the United States
Murder in Alabama
United States murder case law